Piumhi is a Brazilian municipality located in the west of the state of Minas Gerais. Its population as of 2020 was 34,918 people living in a total area of 902 km². The city belongs to the meso-region of Oeste de Minas and Alto Paranaíba and to the micro-region of Piumhi.  It became a municipality in 1868.

The name
The origin of the word "pium-i" is indigenous and it means either "river of many fish" or "water of many flies".

On older maps the city is referred to as Piui and is referred to as such by Citybrazil.  The official name given by IBGE and by the city government site is Piumhi.

Location
The city center of Piumhi is located at an elevation of 922 meters, just off state highway MG-050.  Neighboring  municipalities are:  Bambuí (N), Doresópolis (NE), São Roque de Minas (S and SE), and Sacramento (W).  The great reservoir of Furnas lies a short distance to the south and the National Park of Serra da Canastra, with the source of the São Francisco River, lies 50 km to the west.

Communications and Distances
Piumhi is connected to Passos, in the southwest, and Formiga, in the east, by state highway MG-050.   The nearest railroad station is in Formiga. The distance to Belo Horizonte is 264 km.

Micro-region of Piumhi
Piumhi is also a statistical micro-region including Bambuí, Córrego Danta, Doresópolis, Iguatama, Medeiros, Piumhi, São Roque de Minas, Tapiraí, and Vargem Bonita.

Economic activities
Services are the most important economic activity.  The GDP in 2005 was approximately R$327 million, with 32 million reais from taxes, 195 million reais from services, 26 million reais from industry, and 73 million reais from agriculture.  There were 1,021 rural producers on 68,000 hectares of land.  317 farms had tractors (2006).  Approximately 4,800 persons were dependent on agriculture.  The main crops are coffee (8,940 hectares in 2006),  rice, beans, and corn.  There were 42,000 head of cattle (2006), one quarter of which were raised for milk and cheese production. 

There were 4 banks (2007) and 6,106 automobiles (2007), giving a ratio of 5 inhabitants per automobile. 

Working population in 2005
Workers in 135 transformation industries: 583
Workers in 740 units of commerce: 2,303
Workers in 62 units of food and lodging: 163

Health and education
In the health sector there were 13 public health clinics (2005) and 1 hospital with 118 beds.  Patients with more serious health conditions are transported to Araxá or to Uberaba, which are connected by good roads.  Educational needs of 6,500 students were met by 14 primary schools, 5 middle schools, and 12 pre-primary schools.  

Municipal Human Development Index: 0.800 (2000)
State ranking: 39 out of 853 municipalities as of 2000
National ranking: 568 out of 5,138 municipalities as of 2000 
Literacy rate: 90%
Life expectancy: 74 (average of males and females)

In 2000 the per capita monthly income of R$337.00 was above the state and national average of R$276.00 and R$297.00 respectively.

The highest ranking municipality in Minas Gerais in 2000 was Poços de Caldas with 0.841, while the lowest was Setubinha with 0.568.  Nationally the highest was São Caetano do Sul in São Paulo with 0.919, while the lowest was Setubinha.  In more recent statistics (considering 5,507 municipalities) Manari in the state of Pernambuco has the lowest rating in the country—0,467—putting it in last place.

See also
 List of municipalities in Minas Gerais

References

External links
Prefeitura municipal de Piumhi

Municipalities in Minas Gerais